Personal Stereo is the fifth album by Norwegian electronic band Flunk released in 2007 on Beatservice Records.

Track listing

TRACKS:
 Personal Stereo
 Heavenly
 If We Kiss
 Haldi
 Sit Down
 See You
 Two Icicles
 Change My Ways
 Keep On
 'Diet Of Water And Love' by The Valium Poets

2007 albums
Flunk albums